Alex Tolgos is a Kenyan engineer and politician who served as the governor of Elgeyo Marakwet County. He was elected the first governor of the county on March 4, 2013, and was again re-elected on August 8, 2017, to serve for a second and final term as governor.

Early life and education 
Tolgos was born on 6 May 1980 in Elgeyo-Marakwet, Kenya.

Tolgos attended  St. Patrick's High School (Iten, Kenya).

He graduated from the University of Nairobi with B.Sc. degree in mechanical engineering.

References

1980 births
Living people
Jubilee Party politicians
Kenyan engineers
University of Nairobi alumni
People from Elgeyo-Marakwet County